Peter Howell may refer to:

Peter Howell (musician) (born c. 1948), musician and composer
Peter Howell (actor) (1919–2015), British actor
Peter Howell (historian) (born 1941), British academic and historian
Peter Howell (psychologist), Professor of Experimental Psychology at University College London

See also
Peter Howells (disambiguation)